Hakkı Tunaboylu (1895– 23 July 1958) was the 8th Chief of the General Staff of Turkey.

He graduated from the military academy and served as artillery officer during World War I.

Career
Tunaboylu left his position in Ottoman Army and joined the war effort for the independence of Turkey on 31 July 1921. After graduating from the Army War College in 1927, he served in various commands till 1945. In 1945, Brigadier General, Major-General in 1947, Lieutenant General in 1950 and was promoted to the rank of General in 1955. He served as acting  Chief of General Staff between 25 August 1955 - 17 September 1955, and as 8th Chief of General Staff until retirement on 3 October 1957.

He died on 28 October 1958 while serving as an elected member of the 11th Turkish Parliament.

References

1895 births
1958 deaths
Ottoman military personnel of World War I
Turkish military personnel of the Turkish War of Independence